Anthene lamprocles, the lesser black-patches, is a butterfly in the family Lycaenidae. It is found in Nigeria (the Cross River loop), Cameroon, the Republic of the Congo, the Central African Republic and the Democratic Republic of the Congo (Uele and Ituri). The habitat consists of forests.

References

Butterflies described in 1878
Anthene
Butterflies of Africa
Taxa named by William Chapman Hewitson